Light and Shade is the fourth studio album by Norwegian new wave band Fra Lippo Lippi. It was recorded in Los Angeles, California and produced by Walter Becker (of Steely Dan fame).

Following the success of the 1985 album Songs, Virgin Records had the band work on a follow-up album with the US as its intended target market. The first single "Angel" received moderate airplay on a radio station in Los Angeles. However, during this time, the US arm of Virgin Records dropped several artists off their roster — Fra Lippo Lippi being one of them. Frustrated by the album's failure to capture the US market, the band parted ways with Virgin Records in 1988.

Track listing
 "Angel"
 "Freedom"
 "Don't Take Away That Light"
 "Beauty and Madness"
 "Home"
 "Light and Shade"
 "Some People"
 "Crazy Wisdom"
 "Stardust Motel"
 "Indifference"

Personnel
Rune Kristoffersen – bass
Per Øystein Sørensen – vocals, keyboards
Walter Becker – guitar
Tim Weston – guitar
Dean Parks – guitar
Mark Morgan – keyboards
Robbie Buchanan – keyboards
Mark Isham – trumpet
Tom Scott – saxophone
Jimmy Haslip – bass
Jimmy Johnson – bass
Abraham Laboriel – bass
Leroy Clouden – drums
Claude Pepper – drums
Jeff Porcaro – drums
Carlos Vega – drums
Paulinho da Costa – percussion

References

Fra Lippo Lippi (band) albums
1987 albums
Albums produced by Walter Becker
Virgin Records albums